"Doin' Time" is a song by American band Sublime for their self-titled third album. The lyrics tell of a cheating girlfriend, whose infidelities and poor treatment of her lover makes him feel like he is in prison. It was released as a single on November 25, 1997; the disc contained alternate versions of the song by Wyclef Jean and the Pharcyde. Additional versions appeared on the post-Bradley Nowell compilation album Second-hand Smoke and several bootlegs, including one with Snoop Dogg.

This song reached number 87 on the Billboard Hot 100 and number 28 on the Modern Rock Tracks chart.

Composition
"Doin' Time" samples jazz flautist Herbie Mann's cover of George Gershwin's "Summertime" from the opera Porgy and Bess. Mann's version is a live bossa nova version from his album Herbie Mann at the Village Gate. The band originally recorded the song with the lyrics "doin' time and the livin's easy". In order to release the song using the Gershwin sample, the band had to agree to use the line "summertime" instead of "doin' time". However, the song was already recorded with the "doin' time" lyric, and lead singer Bradley Nowell had recently died of a heroin overdose. The lyric was re-recorded by Sublime's friend/producer Michael Happoldt singing "summertime". It is this version of the song that appears on Sublime's self-titled album. Future Long Beach Dub Allstars DJ Marshall Goodman appears on the recording and is mentioned in the lyrics.

The line "And we can do it like this, in the place to be." is sampled from the Beastie Boys' "Slow and Low" from their 1986 album Licensed to Ill. The song also samples "Jump for Jah" and "Come Now" by Ini Kamoze, "Buffalo Gals" by Malcolm McLaren, and "Holy Thursday" by David Axelrod.

Re-release
The original version of "Doin' Time" with the original, unaltered vocal was released in 2006 on the Deluxe Edition of the band's self-titled Sublime album, as well as the 2 disc 180 gram vinyl "Back To Black 60th Vinyl Anniversary" edition. The deluxe edition also includes 5 remixes of "Doin' Time", and the original music video.

Track listing
"Doin' Time" (Bradley Version) – 4:16
"Doin' Time" (Remixed by Wyclef Jean) – 3:49
"Doin' Time" (Remixed by Marshall Arts featuring The Pharcyde) – 4:10
"Doin' Time" (Album Version) – 4:12

Charts

Lana Del Rey version

On May 7, 2019, American singer Lana Del Rey teased a cover of the song and said it was "coming soon". Del Rey's cover was officially released on May 17, 2019, coinciding with the premiere of a documentary about Sublime at the Tribeca Film Festival. It was released as the fourth single from Del Rey's sixth studio album Norman Fucking Rockwell!. On August 29, 2019, she released a music video for the cover, which referenced the film Attack of the 50 Foot Woman (1958).  When asked about covering the song, Del Rey credited the transitioning of and shifts in genres to Sublime, saying the group "made a genre and sound totally their own", adding that because of the indelible "SoCal vibe" the group created, "not a day goes by that [she does not] listen to at least one Sublime song."

Critical reception
Del Rey's version of "Doin' Time" was met with unanimous acclaim, with music critics as well as Sublime's former bandmates and family offering praise for Del Rey's treatment of the song. 

An article from Rolling Stone that described Del Rey's cover as "shimmering" and "glittering" included Sublime drummer Bud Gaugh's personal evaluation of Del Rey's version, wherein Gaugh lauded the incorporation of her well-recognized vocal style into the song and said that the "smoky, sexy, and iconic sound of her voice breathes new life into one of our favorite singles." In an interview published by  iHeartRadio, Troy Dendekker, the widow of Sublime frontman Bradley Nowell, likewise praised Del Rey's cover by calling it "magical and haunting" and explained that it was "an honor to have [Del Rey’s] talent complement the Sublime legacy."

Billboard, reviewer Gil Kaufman stated that Del Rey "does [the song] justice", particular highlighting how Del Rey incorporated her own "sleepy, intimate vibe over the song's laid-back groove." The Faders Meaghan Garvey gave a positive review to the song, saying that "the song of the summer is 'Doin' Time' by Sublime, as sung by Lana herself”, and opined that “[Del Rey's] version of 'Doin' Time' improves upon the original, with its slinkier arrangement and fluttering bridge.". Stereogums Keely Quinlan gave an overwhelmingly positive review, praising it as a "very, very good" cover and went on to state that Del Rey's "stacked, reverb-soaked vocals fit this vibe expertly, and some additional percussion adds a gorgeous sweetness." Eric Torres of Pitchfork also gave praise to Del Rey's version when he described the cover as "decidedly within Del Rey's wheelhouse.” and highlighted the way in which Del Rey "[adapted] Bradley Nowell's expressive rapping into her own blasé drawl.”

Music video
In the video, Del Rey — as an analog of the 50 Foot giant woman — appears amid locations across Los Angeles. At the video's beginning, Del Rey is found reclining in an empty channel of the L.A. River. She plucks a palm tree out of the ground and walks up a downtown L.A. street with it, then drops it. She then drinks from a water tower (which has disappointingly little water in it, reflecting the lyric that her lover cheats and then there's very little left for her) and checks her makeup in a glass window. She steps over a freeway and goes to Venice Beach, where she walks into the ocean and splashes in the water. This is revealed to be a movie that Lizzy, the old Lana, is watching at the Drive-In. She sees her boyfriend making out with another girl and she doesn't look pleased. After messing with sand, Lana from the movie blows a sandstorm into the audience, then climbs out of the drive-in screen to shake & drop the car her boyfriend and the other girl is in, killing them, exacting revenge on behalf of Lizzy. She and Lizzy give each other a smile, then she climbs back into the movie.

Credits and personnel
Lana Del Rey – vocals
Andrew Watt – production, instrumentation, programming, guitar, mixing
Happy Perez – production
 Eric Wilson – bass guitar
 Josh Freese – drums
 Bud Gaugh – drums
 Gale Levant – harp
Paul LaMalfe – engineering, mixing
 Dave Kutch – mastering

Charts

Weekly charts

Year-end charts

Certifications

Awards

Release history

In popular culture
 The song is featured in the soundtrack for the 2001 video game Dave Mirra Freestyle BMX 2.

References

1996 songs
1997 singles
2019 singles
Sublime (band) songs
Wyclef Jean songs
Lana Del Rey songs
Songs with music by George Gershwin
Songs with lyrics by Ira Gershwin
Songs with lyrics by DuBose Heyward
Songs written by Bradley Nowell
Song recordings produced by David Kahne
Songs about California
Songs about prison
Songs about infidelity